Kirchdorf is a municipality in the district of Diepholz, in Lower Saxony, Germany. It is situated approximately 30 km east of Diepholz, and 35 km north of Minden.

Kirchdorf is also the seat of the Samtgemeinde ("collective municipality") Kirchdorf.

References

External links
 Map of Kirchdorf, Lower Saxony on Mapcarta

Diepholz (district)